Udane is a small village in the state of Maharashtra, India. It is located in the Dhule taluka of Dhule District in Maharashtra.

Location
Udane is located on the Maharashtra Other District Road 98 (ODR 98).

Climate
Udane has three distinct seasons during the year: summer, winter, and the rainy season.

Demographics
As of 2001 census, Udane had a population of 3,312 with 1,724 males and 1,588 females.

There are total of 580 households in the village.

References

Villages in Dhule taluka
Villages in Dhule district